The four-fingered shadeskink or four-toed litter-skink (Saproscincus tetradactylus) is a species of skink found in Queensland in Australia.

References

Saproscincus
Reptiles described in 1980
Skinks of Australia
Endemic fauna of Australia
Taxa named by Allen Eddy Greer
Taxa named by Arnold G. Kluge